Delhi United FC (formerly Delhi United Soccer Club) is an Indian professional football club based in New Delhi, that competes in the FD A-Division. They play their home games at Ambedkar Stadium, New Delhi. However, in DSA Senior Division season 2019–20, the club played their home games at Jawaharlal Nehru Stadium, New Delhi. The club was established in 1995. They have previously participated in the 2012 Durand Cup.

History
Delhi United Football Club, earlier named as Gorkha Heroes, was founded in 1995 by Lal Bahadur Basnet. The club is affiliated with Football Delhi (formerly known as Delhi Soccer Association). Gorkha Heroes were playing in lower division of DSA League till 2007, until B. S. Mehra took over the club management. In 2007, Gorkha Heroes became champions of B Division without losing a single match, and got promoted to A Division. Their superb form continued as they were crowned overall champions in 2008–09, keeping unbeaten record intact.

In 2009, the name was changed to Delhi United FC. In Senior Division 2009–10 season, they defeated City FC with a score of 13–0 in a match which is still the highest scoring game in Delhi's top flight. In 2010–11, the club focused its attention to I-League 2nd Division and strengthened their squad by signing some top Delhi players. Their hard work finally paid off and they became champions of the Senior Division by defeating Shahdara FC in final with a score of 3–2.

Delhi United gave the best performance in Durand Cup 2012 by qualifying for quarterfinals by defeating Indian Navy and Army Greens in qualifying rounds.

Winning the Senior Division finally confirmed their participation in I-League 2nd Division for the 2012–13 campaign. They performed well in the I-League’s second tier and were the best team from North India.

Delhi United again participated in I-League 2nd Division in 2016–17 season, and secured third spot in the final round. Ahead of the 2017–18 I-League 2nd Division season, they roped in Portuguese manager Hugo Martins. Their campaign ended in the Group stages after finishing fourth with 9 points.

I-League
On 21 September 2018, it was revealed that both Mumbai FC and Delhi United FC had submitted documents for direct-entry into the I-League.

On 27 January 2020, a Delhi based fan club of former Indian Super League outfit Delhi Dynamos, Dynamos Ultras were handed over operational activities of the club. Aditya Raghav was appointed as the new team manager, and Ayush Bhuttan was appointed as the new head coach. Under the new management, club played 3 matches, before season was put on hold due to coronavirus pandemic outbreak.

Stadium

Ambedkar Stadium in Delhi used to be the clubs' home ground for the DSA Senior Division. It has also hosted I-League 2nd Division matches for the club. It has a capacity of 30,000 spectators.

Players

First team squad

Kit manufacturers and shirt sponsors

Current staff

Managerial record
updated on 7 April 2020

Honours
I-League 2nd Division
Third place (1): 2016–17

See also
 List of football clubs in Delhi

References

External links
 

Football in Delhi
Association football clubs established in 1995
1995 establishments in Delhi
Football clubs in New Delhi
I-League 2nd Division clubs